Floria is a small village in the Selino province of southwest Crete, Greece. Floria is part of the Kandanos municipality and, according to the latest census, has around 60 inhabitants.

On 23 May 1941 and while the Battle of Crete was unfolding, Floria was the location of a fierce battle between advancing German troops and the local population, who spontaneously decided to resist them. In reprisal, a few days later German forces executed several of the villagers during an operation that resulted in the razing of Kandanos.

Floria is also a name for a girl such as Florence or Florida.

See also
Kandanos
Razing of Kandanos

External links 
German occupation of Crete: Floria (in German -- translate)

Populated places in Chania (regional unit)